The United States Naval Academy Pipes and Drums is a highland musical cadet unit of the United States Naval Academy (USNA). Currently, the 42-member military pipe band is the only active duty unit of its kind in any service of the Department of the Navy (United States Marine Corps included). The band group provides musical support to the academy's Brigade of Midshipmen as well as the larger city of Annapolis, Maryland. It is one of several service academies to maintain bagpipe bands, alsonside the West Point Pipes and Drums and the Virginia Military Institute Pipes and Drums. The USNA Pipe Band is one of the more recent of these types of bands, being established in 1996 with funding being provided by members of the Annapolis class of 1961. It was officially approved as a Brigade Support Activity (BSA) three years later.

Today, it provides musical support for the following events and musical requirements of the USNA:

Graduation and commissioning ceremonies of USNA Classes 
Military/patriotic ceremonies
Public concerts and social events
Retirement ceremonies
Funerals
Sporting events/televised performances
Organized civil/military parades
Celtic, Scottish and other cultural festivals
Pipe band competitions
Any other solo activity or joint activity with the United States Naval Academy Band

The band wears a kilt which features the Polaris Military Tartan when they are in the parade ground. The design originated in the early 1960s and was pioneered by Captain Walter Schlech and Alexander MacIntyre of Strone.  The tartan is patterned in service tartan of the navy and is similar to the Black Watch tartan with the only difference being the addition of a four thread overcheck consisting of yellow - black - sky blue - black - yellow.

Gallery

References

 

Bands of the United States Navy
Musical groups established in 1996
United States Naval Academy
College marching bands in the United States
Pipe bands
Military academy bands
Ceremonial units of the United States military